Jacob Spivakofsky, a Russian Jew, was one of the first stars in the early years of Yiddish theater.

The highly cultured scion of a wealthy Odesa Jewish family, Spivakofsky had an academic education and was already a well-traveled young man who, by Jacob Adler's account "acted with talent and taste in Russian amateur theatricals" and "recited the poetry of Pushkin with something close to genius" (Adler, 1999, 60) when he was sent in 1877 to Bucharest, Romania as a foreign correspondent for an Odesa newspaper, to cover the Russo-Turkish War. He crossed paths with Abraham Goldfaden, who only a year earlier had founded the first professional Yiddish-language theater troupe, and abandoned journalism to become a romantic leading man.

He soon left Goldfaden's troupe along with fellow Odesite Israel Rosenberg. They briefly toured (with a repertoire purloined from Goldfaden) in Moldavia, but the end of the war dried up the supply of free-spending merchants and middlemen who had briefly made Yiddish theater in Romania a prosperous enterprise. At the suggestion of Jacob Adler, they came back to Odesa, where Spivakofsky was the first leading man in Rosenberg's new Odesa-based troupe, the first professional Yiddish theater troupe in Imperial Russia. (Adler, 1999, 60, 68)

References
 Adler, Jacob, A Life on the Stage: A Memoir, translated and with commentary by Lulla Rosenfeld, Knopf, New York, 1999, .

Odesa Jews
Actors from Odesa
Yiddish theatre performers
Year of birth missing
Year of death missing
19th-century births